The 1996–97 ECHL season was the ninth season of the ECHL.  Before the start of the season, two franchises relocated, one was renamed, and two expansion franchises were founded.  Founding member Erie Panthers moved to Baton Rouge, LA and the Nashville Knights moved to Pensacola, FL, the Wheeling Thunderbirds changed their name to the Wheeling Nailers following a lawsuit with WHL's Seattle Thunderbirds, and the ECHL welcomed franchises in Peoria, IL and Biloxi, MS.

In 1996, the ECHL Board of Governors decided to retire the Jack Riley Cup and create a new trophy, the Patrick J. Kelly Cup, named after founding father and former ECHL commissioner, Patrick J. Kelly.  The league also created a new individual award, the Sportsmanship Award, to be awarded to the player adjudged to have exhibited the best type of sportsmanship and gentlemanly conduct combined with a high standard of playing ability as voted by the coaches of each of the ECHL teams.

The South Carolina Stingrays finished first overall in the season and became the first team in ECHL history to win the Brabham and Kelly Cups in the same year as they defeated the Louisiana IceGators 4 games to 1.

Regular season

Final standings
Note: GP = Games played, W = Wins, L = Losses, T = Ties, Pts = Points, GF = Goals for, GA = Goals against, Green shade = Clinched playoff spot, Blue shade = Clinched division

Kelly Cup playoffs

Bracket

First round

Quarterfinals

Semifinals

Kelly Cup finals

ECHL awards

References

See also
 ECHL
 ECHL All-Star Game
 Kelly Cup
 List of ECHL seasons

ECHL seasons
ECHL season, 1996-97